The 2023 Vuelta a España is a three-week cycling race taking place in the Spain. It will be the 78th edition of the Vuelta a España. It will start in Barcelona.

Teams

UCI WorldTeams

 
 
 
 
 
 
 
 
 
 
 
 
 
 
 
 
 
 

UCI WorldTeams

Route and stages

References

External links 
 

2023
 
2023 UCI World Tour
2023 in Spanish sport
2023 in road cycling
Vuelta
Vuelta
Vuelta